Darband-e Zard-e Olya (also Romanized as Dārband-e Zard-e ‘Olyā; also known as Darband-e Zard and Dārvand-e Zard) is a village in Sarqaleh Rural District, Ozgoleh District, Salas-e Babajani County, Kermanshah Province, Iran. At the 2006 census, its population was 35, in seven families.

References 

Populated places in Salas-e Babajani County